Vern-sur-Seiche (Gallo: Vèrn) is a commune in the Ille-et-Vilaine department in Brittany in northwestern France.

Population
Inhabitants of Vern-sur-Seiche are called Vernois and Vernoises in French.

See also
Communes of the Ille-et-Vilaine department

References

External links

Official website Vern-sur-Seiche 
Mayors of Ille-et-Vilaine Association 

Communes of Ille-et-Vilaine